Holt Township is the name of a few places in the United States:

Holt Township, Taylor County, Iowa
Holt Township, Fillmore County, Minnesota
Holt Township, Marshall County, Minnesota
Holt Township, Gage County, Nebraska
Holt Township, Adams County, North Dakota

Township name disambiguation pages